Laurent Gras (born 15 March 1976 in Chamonix, France) is a professional French ice hockey player who participated at the 2010 IIHF World Championship as a member of the France National men's ice hockey team.

References

External links

1976 births
Living people
Chamonix HC players
French ice hockey centres
Ice hockey players at the 1998 Winter Olympics
Ice hockey players at the 2002 Winter Olympics
Olympic ice hockey players of France
People from Chamonix
Sportspeople from Haute-Savoie